Madeleine Wing Adler was the first female president of West Chester University in West Chester, Pennsylvania. She received a bachelor's degree from Northwestern University and master's degree and Ph.D. in political science from the University of Wisconsin–Madison.

Prior to her West Chester University presidency, she held administrative positions at Framingham State College in Massachusetts, The City University of New York, Queens College, and the CUNY Central Office. Adler also has taught at American University and Pennsylvania State University.

Adler has served on numerous boards and committees for civic organizations, including Chester County Fund for Women and Girls, the Chester County Historical Society and the National Endowment for the Arts/American Canvas. In 1998, Chester County named her its citizen of the year and the Philadelphia Business Journal named her a Woman of Distinction in 2002.

On May 3, 2007, Adler announced her retirement after serving 15 years at the institution.

She is a senior associate at The AASCU-Penson Center for Professional Development, and plans will retire to her family's ancestral seaport town of Sandwich, Massachusetts, on Cape Cod.

Madeleine Wing Adler Theatre
The Madeleine Wing Adler Theatre which opened in 2008, is the newest performing arts venue on the West Chester University campus and has a capacity of 375. It was named in honor of Madeleine Wing Adler in 2008.

Personal life
Adler is a breast cancer survivor, and has received the Pennsylvania Breast Cancer Coalition's Pink Ribbon Award in 2001.

References

Living people
Year of birth missing (living people)
People from Worthington, Ohio
Northwestern University alumni
 University of Wisconsin–Madison College of Letters and Science alumni
Heads of universities and colleges in the United States

Presidents of West Chester University